Dry Creek is a stream in Pulaski County, Missouri. It is a tributary of the Big Piney River.

Dry Creek was so named for the fact it often runs dry.

See also
List of rivers of Missouri

References

Rivers of Pulaski County, Missouri
Rivers of Missouri